"Lonely" was the fourth single from Shannon Noll's second album Lift. Co-written by Noll, the single was released on 26 August 2006

With the release of the single, Noll created Australian ARIA chart history, becoming the first artist to have his first eight single releases reach the Top 10 since the charts induction in 1988 (a record which Noll broke himself following the release of his single with Natalie Bassingthwaighte, "Don't Give Up").

"Lonely" proved to be extremely popular on radio, where it followed the long list of Noll's singles to reach number one on the Australian Airplay Chart. On the high-rating 2DayFM "Hot 30" countdown, it spent a record-breaking total of 73 nights in the countdown.

The single's video was directed by Anthony Rose. The clip was shot in Sydney at the Star City Showroom as a live clip during his "Now I Run" tour in July 2006. The video follows Noll in his hotel room and travelling in the streets in a cab on his way to the gig.

The single features an acoustic version of Noll's previous single "Now I Run".

Track listing
 "Lonely" (radio mix) – 4:44
 "Lonely" – 4:43
 "Now I Run" (acoustic) – 3:48

Charts

Weekly charts

Year-ed charts

References

2006 singles
Shannon Noll songs
Songs written by Shannon Noll